The Upper Tabuating Dam is a multi-purpose earth-fill dam located at Barangay Nazareth, General Tinio, Nueva Ecija in the Philippines. It is located at the upstream of Tabuating River near the border of General Tinio with Fort Magsaysay in Palayan.

Inaugurated in May 2021, it is part of the Upper Tabuating Small Reservoir Irrigation Project (UT-SRIP) of the National Irrigation Administration (NIA) of the Philippines which was designed for tourism, aquaculture, cash crops and power generation.

Background
 The construction of the irrigation component of the project started in 2010 but was suspended after the opposition of then General Tinio mayor  Virgilio Bote. In February 2015, NIA lifted the suspension of the construction after Bote agreed to continue the project. In the same month, the dam component of the project was started. In June 2019, 3,000 narra and mahogany seedlings were planted in the dam's watershed as part of Sierra Madre reforesting efforts. The irrigation system's dry run was conducted from December 2020 until May 2021 which produced 91,182 sacks of rice in its service area.

See also
 Agriculture in the Philippines
 Energy in the Philippines
 Water supply and sanitation in the Philippines

References

Dams in the Philippines
Dams completed in 2020
2020 establishments in the Philippines
Buildings and structures in Nueva Ecija
Earth-filled dams
Sierra Madre (Philippines)